Feofan Lebedev (15 November 1871 – 1 November 1966) was an Estonian sports shooter. He competed in five events at the 1912 Summer Olympics, representing the Russian Empire.

References

External links
 

1871 births
1966 deaths
Estonian male sport shooters
Russian male sport shooters
Olympic shooters of Russia
Shooters at the 1912 Summer Olympics
Sportspeople from Narva
Estonian people of Russian descent